The Computer Systems Research Group (CSRG) was a research group at the University of California, Berkeley that was dedicated to enhancing AT&T Unix operating system and funded by Defense Advanced Research Projects Agency.

History

Professor Bob Fabry of Berkeley acquired a UNIX source license from AT&T in 1974. His group started to modify UNIX, and distributed their version as the Berkeley Software Distribution (BSD). In April 1980, Fabry signed a contract with DARPA to develop UNIX even further and accommodate the specific requirements of the ARPAnet. With this funding, Fabry created the Computer Systems Research Group.

The Berkeley Sockets API and Berkeley Fast File System are some of the group's most significant innovations. The sockets interface solved the problem of supporting multiple protocols (e.g. XNS and TCP/IP), and extended UNIX's "everything is a file" notion to these network protocols, while the Fast File System increased the block allocation size from 512 bytes to 4096 bytes (or larger), improving disk transfer performance, while also allowing "micro-blocks" as small as 128 bytes, which improved disk use. Another noteworthy contribution was job control signals, which allowed a user to suspend a job with a key-press (control-Z), and then continue running the job in the background under the C shell.

Noteworthy versions of BSD were 3.0 BSD (the first version of BSD to support virtual memory), 4.0 BSD (which included the job-control CTRL-Z functionality, to suspend and restart a running job), a special 4.15 (interim) BSD version which had been released using BBN's TCP/IP, and 4.2 BSD (which included a full TCP/IP stack, FFS, and NFS support.)

By the early 1980s, CSRG was the best-known non-commercial Unix developer, and a majority of Unix sites used at least some Berkeley software. AT&T included some CSRG work in Unix System V. During the 1970s and 1980s, AT&T/USL raised the commercial licensing fee for UNIX from $20,000 to $100,000–$200,000. This became a big problem for small research labs and companies who used BSD, and the CSRG decided to replace all the source code that originated from AT&T. They succeeded in 1994, but AT&T disagreed and sued Berkeley. After a court settlement in 1994, CSRG distributed the final version of BSD, called 4.4BSD-Lite2.

The group was disbanded in 1995, leaving a significant legacy: FreeBSD, OpenBSD, NetBSD, and DragonFly BSD are based on the 4.4BSD-Lite distribution and continue to play an important role in the open-source UNIX community today, including dictating the style of C programming used via KNF in the style man page.

Alongside the Free Software Foundation and Linux, the CSRG laid the foundations of the open source community.

Former members include Keith Bostic, Bill Joy, Marshall Kirk McKusick, Samuel J. Leffler, Özalp Babaoğlu and Michael J. Karels, among others. The corporations Sun Microsystems, Berkeley Software Design and Sleepycat Software (later acquired by Oracle) can be considered spin-off companies of CSRG. Berkeley Software Design was led by Robert Kolstad, who led the development of BSD Unix for supercomputers at Convex Computer.

See also
 Mach (kernel)

References

External links
 The Computer Systems Research Group 1979 — 1993
 A more detailed article
 

Berkeley Software Distribution
Science and technology in the San Francisco Bay Area
University of California, Berkeley
Unix history
Research groups